The 1985 RAC Trimoco British Saloon Car Championship was the 28th season of the championship. Andy Rouse won his third consecutive BSCC championship in a Ford Sierra, making it a record four titles in total.

Teams & Drivers
Guest drivers in italics.